Hasselvika Church is a parish church of the Church of Norway in Indre Fosen municipality in Trøndelag county, Norway. It is located in the village of Hasselvika, along the Stjørnfjorden. It is the church for the Hasselvika parish which is part of the Fosen prosti (deanery) in the Diocese of Nidaros. The red, wooden church was built in a long church style in 1951 using plans drawn up by the architect Claus Hjelte (1884–1969). The church seats about 200 people.

See also
List of churches in Nidaros

References

Indre Fosen
Churches in Trøndelag
Long churches in Norway
Wooden churches in Norway
20th-century Church of Norway church buildings
Churches completed in 1951
1951 establishments in Norway